Claudia Riegler may refer to:

 Claudia Riegler (snowboarder) (born 1973), Austrian snowboarder
 Claudia Riegler (skier) (born 1976), Austrian-born New Zealand alpine skier